Somerville is a borough and the county seat of Somerset County, in the U.S. state of New Jersey. The borough has grown to become a commercial hub for central New Jersey and commuter town of New York City.

As of the 2020 United States census, the borough's population was 12,346, an increase of 248 (+2.0%) from the 2010 census count of 12,098, which in turn reflected a decline of 325 (-2.6%) from the 12,423 counted in the 2000 census.

Somerville was originally formed as a town on March 25, 1863, within a portion of Bridgewater Township. Somerville was incorporated as a borough by an act of the New Jersey Legislature on April 16, 1909, based on the results of a referendum held on May 4, 1909, at which point it was fully set off from Bridgewater Township. It is home of the oldest competitive bicycle race in the United States.

The borough is named for Somerset in England.

History

Early development
Somerville was settled in colonial times primarily by the Dutch who purchased land from the English proprietors of the colony. The Dutch established their church near what is today Somerville and a Dutch Reformed minister or Domine lived at the Old Dutch Parsonage from about 1754. The early village grew up around a church, courthouse and a tavern built at a crossroads shortly after the American Revolution. The name "Somerville" was taken from four brothers of the Somerville family, Edward, John and James from Drishane and Castlehaven, County Cork, Ireland, who first founded the town in the 1750s. Somerville was originally a sparsely populated farming community, but rapidly grew after the completion of the railroad in the 1840s and development of water power along the Raritan River in the 1850s. Early industry included brick making from the plentiful red clay and shale on which Somerville is built. While much of the borough features distinctive Victorian architecture in several neighborhoods and along its Main Street, other periods are represented. National Register sites in Somerville include the white marble 1909 Somerville Court House and the wooden and stone colonial Wallace House (today a museum) where George Washington spent a winter during the American Revolutionary War. Near the Wallace House is the Old Dutch Parsonage, where Reverend Jacob Rutsen Hardenbergh, a founder and first president of Rutgers University, then called Queens College, lived. Register listed Victorian structures include the James Harper Smith Estate (privately owned), St. John's Episcopal Church and rectory, and the Fire Museum (a vintage fire house). Other notable, register eligible structures are the Victorian train station (privately owned) and the municipal building, the former Robert Mansion.

Originally the center of local commerce, the borough has evolved into a destination for boutique retail and dining. Modern highways today surround and traverse Somerville, including U.S. Route 22, U.S. Route 202, U.S. Route 206 and Route 28 and is within  of Interstate 287 and Interstate 78, making it an important hub in central New Jersey.

Tour of Somerville
In 1940, the first competitive bicycle race, called the Tour of Somerville was established by bicycle shop owner, Fred Kugler, to showcase his son, Furman, who was a national cycling champion, and who won the initial men's competition. His daughter, Mildred won the women's. The 50-mile race is held annually and has since become the oldest competitive bicycle race in the U.S. It carries a purse of $10,000 for each winner of the women's and men's races.

Downtown today

Main Street Somerville maintains most of its historical buildings, although many are now boutique specialty shops and second-hand shops. Somerville has quite a diverse and large selection of restaurants that draw people from the surrounding area. In many ways, Somerville remains Somerset County's downtown, and is the heart of its designated Regional Center. Several of the factories in Somerville were abandoned and replaced with modern office buildings or remodeled as apartments. Somerville today and historically has had an important African American community, a distinguished member of which was Paul Robeson. Another famous Somerville native was famed character actor Lee Van Cleef. One of the founders of modern American Dance, Ruth St. Denis, made her professional debut at Somerset Hall, once a vaudeville theatre and today a local restaurant. The mix of modern amenities and an interesting and diverse past make Main Street, Somerville a unique destination for dining, strolling and visiting.

Future redevelopment
The shopping center on the west side of the downtown area was demolished and a new shopping center, town homes and other amenities will be built on the shopping center land and on adjacent land in the former borough landfill to the south. Ground was broken for a new "world class" ShopRite supermarket in March 2011 and opened in November 2011. Borough planners envision a transit village style redevelopment centered around the Somerville train station.

Hurricane Floyd
Somerville was hit hard by Hurricane Floyd in September 1999, despite its having been downgraded to a tropical storm by the time it impacted the vicinity. The borough received a record  of rain over three days during the slow moving storm, causing significant flooding and considerable damage.

Regulation concerns
Numerous local and national media publications reported on how the state of New Jersey had eased regulations allowing for home baked goods to be made and sold from a home, but how Somerville in particular still suffers from, "...[a] draconian ordinance that creates a contradiction between Somerville's zoning policies and New Jersey's home baking law..." making it difficult for a small business owner or entrepreneur to try and earn a living in this fashion in Somerville. In order to be able to make her cookies and sell them from her home kitchen was required  "... to pay a $1,000 application fee and put $4,000 into a borough escrow account", in addition to notifying neighbors, placing a public notice advertisement and having a public hearing on the application.

Geography
According to the United States Census Bureau, the borough had a total area of 2.37 square miles (6.13 km2), including 2.34 square miles (6.06 km2) of land and 0.03 square miles (0.07 km2) of water (1.18%). The borough's territory is flat land. Somerville borders the Raritan River to the south and is crossed by Peters Brook, a tributary.

The borough borders Bridgewater Township, Hillsborough Township and Raritan.

Climate
Somerville's climate is warm during summer when temperatures tend to be in the 80s, and 90s and cold during winter when temperatures tend to be in the 20s and 30s.

The warmest month of the year is July with an average maximum temperature of 84.40 degrees Fahrenheit, while the coldest month of the year is January with an average minimum temperature of 19.10 degrees Fahrenheit.

Temperature variations between night and day tend to be moderate during summer with a difference that can reach 22 degrees Fahrenheit, and fairly limited during winter with an average difference of 19 degrees Fahrenheit.

Rainfall in is fairly evenly distributed throughout the year.

Demographics

2010 census

The Census Bureau's 2006–2010 American Community Survey showed that (in 2010 inflation-adjusted dollars) median household income was $69,836 (with a margin of error of +/− $5,384) and the median family income was $80,461 (+/− $9,281). Males had a median income of $45,929 (+/− $5,005) versus $46,540 (+/− $3,751) for females. The per capita income for the borough was $30,272 (+/− $2,145). About 3.6% of families and 6.9% of the population were below the poverty line, including 3.8% of those under age 18 and 10.8% of those age 65 or over.

2000 census
As of the 2000 United States census there were 12,423 people, 4,743 households, and 2,893 families residing in the borough. The population density was 5,262.4 people per square mile (2,032.4/km2). There were 4,882 housing units at an average density of 2,068.0 per square mile (798.7/km2). The racial makeup of the borough was 71.21% White, 12.93% African American, 0.19% Native American, 7.35% Asian, 0.02% Pacific Islander, 5.10% from other races, and 3.20% from two or more races. Hispanic or Latino of any race were 17.00% of the population.

There were 4,743 households, of which 28.6% had children under the age of 18, 44.5% were married couples living together, 11.9% had a female householder with no husband present, and 39.0% were non-families. 31.4% of all households were made up of individuals, and 11.2% had someone living alone who was 65 years of age or older. The average household size was 2.49 and the average family size was 3.15.

The borough population consists of 21.9% under the age of 18, 9.0% from 18 to 24, 35.8% from 25 to 44, 19.3% from 45 to 64, and 14.0% who were 65 years of age or older. The median age was 36 years. For every 100 females, there were 101.2 males. For every 100 females age 18 and over, there were 99.1 males.

The median income for a household in the borough was $51,237, and the median income for a family was $60,422. Males had a median income of $40,585 versus $32,697 for females. The per capita income for the borough was $23,310. About 4.8% of families and 7.7% of the population were below the poverty line, including 10.7% of those under age 18 and 8.6% of those age 65 or over.

Government

Local government
Somerville is governed under the Borough form of New Jersey municipal government, which is used in 218 municipalities (of the 564) statewide, making it the most common form of government in New Jersey. The governing body is comprised of the Mayor and the Borough Council, with all positions elected at-large on a partisan basis as part of the November general election. The Mayor is elected directly by the voters to a four-year term of office. The Borough Council is comprised of six members elected to serve three-year terms on a staggered basis, with two seats coming up for election each year in a three-year cycle. The Borough form of government used by Somerville is a "weak mayor / strong council" government in which council members act as the legislative body with the mayor presiding at meetings and voting only in the event of a tie. The mayor can veto ordinances subject to an override by a two-thirds majority vote of the council. The mayor makes committee and liaison assignments for council members, and most appointments are made by the mayor with the advice and consent of the council.  The Borough Council elects a member to serve as Council President to act in the absence of the Mayor. Each council member is appointed by the Mayor to one of six standing committee's during the Annual Reorganization Meeting held on January 1 of each year.

, the Mayor of Somerville is Democrat Dennis Sullivan, whose term of office ends December 31, 2023. Members of the Somerville Borough Council are Council President RanD Pitts (D, 2024), Granville Y. Brady Jr. (D, 2023), Thompson H. Mitchell (D, 2024), Gina Stravic (D, 2022), Roger Vroom III (D, 2022) and Frederick Wied V (D, 2023).

In January 2022, the Borough Council appointed Gina Stravic to fill the seat expiring in December 2022 that had been held by Jane C. Kobuta until she resigned from office.

Federal, state and county representation

 

Somerset County is governed by a five-member Board of County Commissioners, whose members are elected at-large to three-year terms of office on a staggered basis, with one or two seats coming up for election each year. At an annual reorganization meeting held on the first Friday of January, the board selects a Director and Deputy Director from among its members. , Somerset County's County Commissioners are
Director Shanel Robinson (D, Franklin Township, term as commissioner ends December 31, 2024; term as director ends 2022),
Deputy Director Melonie Marano (D, Green Brook Township, term as commissioner and as deputy director ends 2022),
Paul Drake (D, Hillsborough Township, 2023),
Douglas Singleterry (D, North Plainfield, 2023) and 
Sara Sooy (D, Basking Ridge in Bernards Township, 2024).
Pursuant to Article VII Section II of the New Jersey State Constitution, each county in New Jersey is required to have three elected administrative officials known as constitutional officers. These officers are the County Clerk and County Surrogate (both elected for five-year terms of office) and the County Sheriff (elected for a three-year term). Constitutional officers, elected on a countywide basis are 
County Clerk Steve Peter (D, Somerville, 2022),
Sheriff Darrin Russo (D, Franklin Township, 2022) and 
Surrogate Bernice "Tina" Jalloh (D, Franklin Township, 2025)

Politics
As of March 2011, there were a total of 6,565 registered voters in Somerville, of which 1,848 (28.1% vs. 26.0% countywide) were registered as Democrats, 1,358 (20.7% vs. 25.7%) were registered as Republicans and 3,349 (51.0% vs. 48.2%) were registered as Unaffiliated. There were 10 voters registered as Libertarians or Greens. Among the borough's 2010 Census population, 54.3% (vs. 60.4% in Somerset County) were registered to vote, including 69.0% of those ages 18 and over (vs. 80.4% countywide).

In the 2012 presidential election, Democrat Barack Obama received 62.0% of the vote (2,779 cast), ahead of Republican Mitt Romney with 36.4% (1,631 votes), and other candidates with 1.7% (75 votes), among the 4,516 ballots cast by the borough's 6,952 registered voters (31 ballots were spoiled), for a turnout of 65.0%. In the 2008 presidential election, Democrat Barack Obama received 2,847 votes (59.9% vs. 52.1% countywide), ahead of Republican John McCain with 1,814 votes (38.2% vs. 46.1%) and other candidates with 52 votes (1.1% vs. 1.1%), among the 4,751 ballots cast by the borough's 6,547 registered voters, for a turnout of 72.6% (vs. 78.7% in Somerset County). In the 2004 presidential election, Democrat John Kerry received 2,485 votes (53.6% vs. 47.2% countywide), ahead of Republican George W. Bush with 2,019 votes (43.6% vs. 51.5%) and other candidates with 58 votes (1.3% vs. 0.9%), among the 4,633 ballots cast by the borough's 5,974 registered voters, for a turnout of 77.6% (vs. 81.7% in the whole county).

In the 2013 gubernatorial election, Republican Chris Christie received 59.0% of the vote (1,707 cast), ahead of Democrat Barbara Buono with 38.8% (1,123 votes), and other candidates with 2.2% (64 votes), among the 2,972 ballots cast by the borough's 7,019 registered voters (78 ballots were spoiled), for a turnout of 42.3%. In the 2009 gubernatorial election, Republican Chris Christie received 1,465 votes (46.8% vs. 55.8% countywide), ahead of Democrat Jon Corzine with 1,265 votes (40.4% vs. 34.1%), Independent Chris Daggett with 334 votes (10.7% vs. 8.7%) and other candidates with 33 votes (1.1% vs. 0.7%), among the 3,128 ballots cast by the borough's 6,605 registered voters, yielding a 47.4% turnout (vs. 52.5% in the county).

Education
The Somerville Public Schools serve students in pre-kindergarten through twelfth grade. As of the 2018–19 school year, the district, comprised of three schools, had an enrollment of 2,398 students and 204.7 classroom teachers (on an FTE basis), for a student–teacher ratio of 11.7:1. Schools in the district (with 2018–19 enrollment data from the National Center for Education Statistics) are 
Van Derveer Elementary School with 802 students in grades Pre-K–5, 
Somerville Middle School with 371 students in grades 6–8 and 
Somerville High School with 1,195 students in grades 9–12. Students from Branchburg Township attend the district's high school as part of a sending/receiving relationship with the Branchburg Township School District. For many years, Branchburg has accounted for 60–65% of the high school's enrollment.

Immaculata High School is a private, coeducational, Roman Catholic high school, founded in 1962. The school enrolls approximately 850 students in grades 9 to 12. Immaculate Conception School is a Catholic private coeducational day school, founded in 1957, for students in grades Pre-K through 8. Both schools operate under the auspices of the Roman Catholic Diocese of Metuchen.

Infrastructure

Transportation

Roads and highways

U.S. Route 22 runs along the northern boundary of Somerville and offers connections to the state highway network. U.S. Route 202 and U.S. Route 206 runs along the western boundary of Somerville, via the Somerville Circle, and provides north–south connections to nearby towns.

Interstate 287 is in neighboring Bridgewater Township and is accessible via US Routes 22 and 202/206.

Public transportation
The Somerville train station offers service on New Jersey Transit's Raritan Valley Line, with frequent service to Newark Penn Station, with connecting service to Penn Station New York in Midtown Manhattan.

Healthcare
Robert Wood Johnson University Hospital for Somerset County is located in the borough, and provides healthcare for Greater Somerset. The hospital was originally founded as Somerset Hospital in 1901, and since has grown into a major university medical center. Since June 1, 2014, the 355 bed facility has been affiliated with Rutgers Robert Wood Johnson Medical School, the largest healthcare network in the state.

Points of interest
The following locations in Somerville are listed on the National Register of Historic Places:

 Wallace House, New Jersey State Historic House Museum – Washington's Headquarters during the second Middlebrook encampment (1778–79).
 Old Dutch Parsonage, New Jersey State Historic Site – First parsonage of the Dutch Reformed Church in Somerset County and home of Reverend Jacob Rutsen Hardenbergh, a founder and later first President of Queens College (now Rutgers University).
 Daniel Robert House, Somerville Borough Hall – Based on Alexander Jackson Davis design, classic example of American Gothic architecture.
 J. Harper Smith Mansion – Library designed by Horace Trumbauer.
 St. John's Episcopal Church – Built in 1895 and designed by Horace Trumbauer.
 West End Hose Company Number 3 – the Somerville Fire Department Museum.

Notable people

People who were born in, residents of, or otherwise closely associated with Somerville include:

 Alicia Albe (born 1977), competitor in rhythmic gymnastics
 Mary Ellicott Arnold (1876–1968), social activist, teacher and writer best known for her memoir In the Land of the Grasshopper Song
 Nicole Arendt (born 1969), professional tennis player
 Frank Asch (born 1946), author of children's literature
 Christopher "Kip" Bateman (born 1957), politician who has served in the New Jersey Senate since 2008, where he represents the 16th Legislative District
 Raymond Bateman (1927–2016), politician who served in the New Jersey Senate in the 1960s and 1970s, who was the Republican nominee for Governor of New Jersey in 1977
 Daniel H. Beekman (1874–1951), Judge of the Somerset County Court of Common Pleas, President of the Second National Bank of Somerville, and Democratic politician
 James J. Bergen (1847–1924), politician who served as Speaker of the New Jersey General Assembly and an Associate Justice of the New Jersey Supreme Court
 Nicholas L. Bissell Jr. (1947–1996), county prosecutor of Somerset County who fled to Laughlin, Nevada and took his own life after being charged with embezzlement, tax fraud and abuse of power
 George H. Brown (1810–1865), represented  in the United States House of Representatives from 1853–1855
 Tony Camillo (1928–2018), record producer and arranger
 Clarence E. Case (1877–1961), politician who served as acting Republican Governor of New Jersey in 1920, succeeding William Nelson Runyon
 Jack M. Ciattarelli (born 1961), entrepreneur and politician who represented the 16th Legislative District in the New Jersey General Assembly from 2011 to 2018
 Alvah A. Clark (1840–1912), represented  in the United States House of Representatives from 1877–1881
 Kate Claxton (1848–1924), stage actress
 Christine Danelson (born 1987), actress best known as the understudy for the role of Tracy in the national tour of the Broadway musical Hairspray
 Royal Page Davidson (1870–1943), educator and inventor
 John G. Demaray (1930–2015), medievalist
 Don Elliott (1926–1984), jazz trumpeter, vibraphonist, vocalist, and mellophone player
 David Felmley (1857–1930), educator who served for 30 years as president of Illinois State University, then known as Illinois State Normal University
 Lewis Van Syckle Fitz Randolph (1838–1921), businessman and politician
 Kevin Foley (born 1987), professional golfer
 Gene Freed (1930–2009), bridge player and physician
 Frederick Frelinghuysen (1753–1804), lawyer, soldier, and senator from New Jersey
 Mary Exton Gaston (1855–1956), first female physician in Somerville and a "major force in the borough's development"
 Frederick Wilson Hall (1908–1984), Associate Justice of the New Jersey Supreme Court from 1959 to 1975
 Reggie Harrison (born 1951), former professional American football running back for four seasons in the National Football League for the Pittsburgh Steelers and St. Louis Cardinals
 Mort Herbert (1925–1983), jazz bassist and lawyer
 Naomi Jakobsson (born 1941), member of the Illinois House of Representatives, representing the 103rd District since 2003
 Walter J. Kavanaugh (1933–2008), member of the State Senate who represented New Jersey's 16th Legislative District who had been a successful businessman in Somerville and a life member of the Somerville First Aid & Rescue Squad
 Joyce Kozloff (born 1942), artist whose politically engaged work has been based on cartography since the early 1990s
 Joe Lis (born 1946), Major League Baseball player who played for Philadelphia, Minnesota, Cleveland and Seattle
 John Mack (1926–2006), principal oboist with the Cleveland Orchestra
 Eric Murdock (born 1968), NBA player for the Utah Jazz, Milwaukee Bucks, Vancouver Grizzlies, Denver Nuggets, Miami Heat, New Jersey Nets and Los Angeles Clippers
 Michael J. Newman (born 1960), United States magistrate judge in the Southern District of Ohio
 Steven J. Ostro (1946–2008), scientist specializing in radar astronomy
 Frank Perantoni (1923–1991), American football center who played professional football for the New York Yankees and later served on the Somerville borough council
 Arnold F. Riedhammer (born 1947), German-American musician, composer, and songwriter
 Helen Riehle (born 1950), politician who serves in the Vermont Senate, representing most of Chittenden County
 Paul Robeson (1898–1976), actor, athlete, bass-baritone concert singer, writer, civil rights activist, Fellow traveler, Spingarn Medal winner, and Stalin Peace Prize laureate
 Brian E. Rumpf (born 1964), politician who represents the 9th Legislative District in the New Jersey General Assembly
 Theodore Runyon (1822–1896), politician, diplomat, and American Civil War brigadier general in the New Jersey Militia
 Skinnyfromthe9 (born 1995), rapper and singer
 Frank Snook (born 1949), former relief pitcher who played for the San Diego Padres
 Ruth St. Denis (1879–1968), modern dance pioneer
 William Gaston Steele (1820–1892), represented New Jersey's 3rd congressional district from 1861–1865
 Douglas Urbanski, film producer
 Lee Van Cleef (1925–1989), actor who was featured in The Good, the Bad and the Ugly, For a Few Dollars More, Escape from New York and many other films and TV series
 Fred Van Eps (1878–1960), banjoist and early recording artist
 Jeffrey Vanderbeek, former owner of the New Jersey Devils
Mauricio Vargas (born 1992), soccer goalkeeper who plays for the Pittsburgh Riverhounds of the United Soccer League
 Frederica von Stade (born 1945), mezzo-soprano
 Daniel Spader Voorhees (1852–1935), New Jersey State Treasurer from 1907–1913
 Jon Williams (born 1961), NFL player for the New England Patriots
 Elvira Woodruff (born 1951), children's writer known for books that include elements of fantasy and history
 Elinor Wylie (1885–1928), poet and novelist, author of Angels and Earthly Creatures, The Orphan Angel and other works

See also

 Somerville Public Library

References

External links

 Borough of Somerville official web site
 Somerville Cable Television
 Downtown Somerville Shopping, Dining & Business Information
 Somerville Public Schools
 
 School Data for the Somerville Public Schools, National Center for Education Statistics
 Somerville Police Department
 Somerset Medical Center
 Somerville Rescue Squad

 
1909 establishments in New Jersey
Borough form of New Jersey government
Boroughs in Somerset County, New Jersey
County seats in New Jersey
Populated places established in 1909